Akuse is a town in the Lower Manya Krobo district of the Eastern Region of Ghana situated between Tema and Akosombo.

It is a fast growing community thanks to a number of companies operating from the area which is attracting skill and capital.

The community hosts a number of public institutions as well including Ghana Prisons, Ghana Health Service, Meteorological Services and Ghana Police Service.

The Kpong Hydro Generation Plant is located in Akuse and managed by the Volta River Authority (VRA).

Climate

References

 https://citinewsroom.com/2019/01/07/youth-donate-to-prison-to-climax-akuse-youth-festival-2018/

Populated places in the Eastern Region (Ghana)